The 1950–51 Illinois Fighting Illini men’s basketball team represented the University of Illinois.

Regular season
A 13 win conference season marked only the second time since 1942 that the Fighting Illini men's basketball team had completed that feat.  The only time they finished with a better conference record was 1943, where they completed the season with a perfect 12-0 record.  Head coach Harry Combes had guided his team to a Big Ten championship, a third-place finish in the 1951 NCAA Division I men's basketball tournament and a final AP ranking of No. 5 in the nation.  This was Combes 2nd Big Ten Championship as well as his 2nd third-place finish in the NCAA tournament within his first 4 years as head coach.  The 1950-51 team compiled an overall record of 22 wins and 5 losses with a conference record of 13 wins and 1 loss.  The season featured a rematch with Kentucky, which had downed the Illini in the national semifinals in 1949. Illinois beat Columbia, 79-71, and North Carolina State, 84-70, to get to the national semifinals and a rematch with the Wildcats. In a heart-breaking loss, Kentucky nipped Illinois, 76-74, on a shot by Wildcat sub Shelby Linville with 12 seconds remaining in the game. The Illini collected third place nationally by beating Oklahoma A&M, 61-46, in Minneapolis. The starting lineup included captain Donald Sunderlage and Theodore Beach as forwards, Rodney Fletcher and Irving Bemoras at guard and Robert Peterson and Mack Follmer rotating at the center position.

Roster

Source

Schedule
												
Source																
												

|-
!colspan=12 style="background:#DF4E38; color:white;"| Non-Conference regular season

				

|-
!colspan=9 style="background:#DF4E38; color:#FFFFFF;"|Big Ten regular season

|-
!colspan=9 style="text-align: center; background:#DF4E38"|NCAA tournament

|-													

Bold Italic connotes conference game

Player stats

Awards and honors
Don Sunderlage
Chicago Tribune Silver Basketball award (1951)
Helms 2nd team All-American (1951)
Sporting News 2nd team All-American (1951)
United Press International 3rd team All-American (1951)
Converse 3rd team All-American (1951)
Associated Press Honorable Mention All-American (1951)
Team Most Valuable Player 
Ted Beach
Converse Honorable Mention All-American (1951)
Rod Fletcher
Converse Honorable Mention All-American (1951)

Team players drafted into the NBA

Rankings

References

Illinois
Illinois
Illinois Fighting Illini men's basketball seasons
NCAA Division I men's basketball tournament Final Four seasons
1950 in sports in Illinois
1951 in sports in Illinois